Cane Hill is the debut EP by American heavy metal band Cane Hill, released on October 23, 2015, through Rise Records.

Track listing

Personnel
Cane Hill
 Elijah Witt – lead vocals
 James Barnett – guitars
 Bemo Barnett – guitars
 Ryan Henriquez – bass
 Devin Clark – drums, percussion

Guest musicians
 Tyler Acord – turntables

Production
 Drew Fulk – production, recording, mixing, mastering

Charts

References

2015 debut EPs
Cane Hill (band) albums
Rise Records albums